Abdulla Juma Abdulla Saadalla is a Tanzanian CCM politician and Member of Parliament for Rahaleo constituency since 2010. He is the Deputy Minister of East African Cooperation.

References

Living people
Chama Cha Mapinduzi MPs
Tanzanian MPs 2010–2015
Deputy government ministers of Tanzania
Year of birth missing (living people)